Machhlivad (also known as Machhaliwad, Machhalivad  or Machalivad) is a medium-sized village and gram panchayat located in the Kalavad taluk of Jamnagar district, Gujarat, India.

Its postcode is 361160; its vill or location code is 513814. The nearest sizeable railway station is Rajkot Junction.

The total area of the village is 1808.46 hectares. The population in 2011 was 958 (484 males, 474 women) occupying 177 houses.

References 

Villages in Jamnagar district